Curry is an unincorporated community in north-central Walker County Alabama, United States. It is the closest community to the Lewis Smith Lake dam. Curry is served by Alabama State Route 257, which is simply known as Curry Highway by locals.

Education
Curry has three primary schools.
Curry Elementary, Curry Middle, And Curry High.
Curry High School is a 5A school, serving grades 9–12. The school colors are Blue and Gold with the mascot being the Yellow Jacket. It is a member of the Walker County Board of Education.

Notable person
 Charles Martin, Alabama politician

References

Unincorporated communities in Alabama
Unincorporated communities in Walker County, Alabama
Birmingham metropolitan area, Alabama